(28 April 1981 – 2 August 2019) was a Japanese manga artist from Okayama Prefecture. Among her best-known series are Your and My Secret and My Heavenly Hockey Club. Morinaga's last work was Kirara no Hoshi, which was published in Betsufure magazine from 2010 to 2015.

Morinaga died on August 2, 2019.

Manga Works 
 
 Kirara no Hoshi
 My Heavenly Hockey Club
 Maniattemasu
 Strawberry chan no Karei na Seikatsu (The Gorgeous Life of Strawberry-chan)
 Yamada Taro Monogatari
 Yamada Taro Monogatari Special Edition
 Your and My Secret
 Welcome to Cosmos Apartment House (one-shot)

References

External links

 
1981 births
2019 deaths
Manga artists from Okayama Prefecture
Women manga artists